Iryna Vasiliyevna Yatchenko (born 31 October 1965) is a Belarusian former discus thrower best known for winning two Olympic bronze medals at the 2000 Summer Olympics and 2004 Summer Olympics, although she was eventually stripped of the latter medal due to a doping offence. She also became world champion at the 2003 World Championships in Athletics. Her personal best is 69.14 metres, achieved in July 2004 in Minsk.

Career
Yatchenko was born in Gomel. Her career at the highest level of competition lasted almost twenty years, starting with the 1990 European Athletics Championships. She threw the discus at five editions of the Olympic Games, competing at all Games from the 1992 Barcelona Games to the 2008 Beijing Olympics. Yatchenko's World Championship career was similarly extensive, as she took part on eight separate occasions.

Yatchenko's final major competition was the 2009 World Championships in Athletics, but she failed to register a valid throw in the qualifying rounds. She retired from international competition in June 2010 and the Belarus National Olympic Committee held a ceremony to honour her career. At the age of 44, she was one of the last athletes to retire who had previously represented the Soviet Union in international athletics.

Yatchenko is married to Igor Astapkovich, also an Olympic medalist in hammer throw.

Doping case 
When the IOC in 2012 re-analysed stored samples from the 2004 Summer Olympics, Yatchenko's sample was found positive for the anabolic steroid Methandienone. IOC subsequently disqualified her results from the Athens Olympics and she was made to return the bronze medal and diploma. The IAAF also banned her for two years from sports and disqualified all her results from 21 August 2004 – 20 August 2006.

Achievements

References

1965 births
Living people
Sportspeople from Gomel
Belarusian female discus throwers
Doping cases in athletics
Belarusian sportspeople in doping cases
Athletes (track and field) at the 1996 Summer Olympics
Athletes (track and field) at the 1992 Summer Olympics
Athletes (track and field) at the 2000 Summer Olympics
Athletes (track and field) at the 2004 Summer Olympics
Athletes (track and field) at the 2008 Summer Olympics
Olympic athletes of Belarus
Olympic bronze medalists for Belarus
World Athletics Championships medalists
Competitors stripped of Summer Olympics medals
Belarusian masters athletes
Medalists at the 2000 Summer Olympics
Olympic bronze medalists in athletics (track and field)
Goodwill Games medalists in athletics
World Athletics Championships winners
Competitors at the 1990 Goodwill Games